Jadval-e Ghureh-ye Mokhtar (also Romanized as Jadval-e Ghūreh-ye Mokhtār; also known as Jadval-e Ghūreh-ye Pā’īn and Jadval-e Ghūreh-ye Soflá) is a village in Sarrud-e Shomali Rural District, in the Central District of Boyer-Ahmad County, Kohgiluyeh and Boyer-Ahmad Province, Iran. At the 2006 census, its population was 307, in 54 families.

References 

Populated places in Boyer-Ahmad County